Progressive Democrats of America (PDA) is a progressive political organization and grassroots political action committee operating primarily within the Democratic Party of the United States. The group has established chapters in 32 states and territories.

History
The Progressive Democrats of America formed out of the presidential campaigns of Howard Dean and Dennis Kucinich as well as with outside, independent involvement from peace and justice activists.

PDA was founded during the 2004 Democratic National Convention in Roxbury, Massachusetts by Tim Carpenter, Steve Cobble, Kevin Spidel, Mimi Kennedy, Laura Bonham, Joe Libertelli, Bruce Taub, and about two dozen other former staffers and supporters of the Dennis Kucinich for President Campaign—as well as Joel Segal, and other progressive activists who helped organize delegates and activists.

Appearing at the first PDA meeting were leaders, activists, and politicians including Dean and Kucinich, U.S. Representatives John Conyers, Jesse Jackson Jr. and Barbara Lee, Rev. Jesse Jackson, James Zogby, Tom Hayden, Medea Benjamin, John Lauritsen, and the late PDA Executive Director Tim Carpenter.

PDA's mission is to strengthen the voice of progressive ideas inside and outside the Democratic Party by using "inside/outside" and "grassroots fusion" models of working both in the Democratic Party as well as working with other progressive organizations both inside and outside the Party.

In March 2019, PDA endorsed Bernie Sanders' 2020 presidential campaign, with Sanders receiving two-thirds of member votes.

Policy positions

Foreign policy
The Progressive Democrats of America opposes wars and occupations. PDA launched a public awareness campaign called Healthcare Not Warfare to emphasize the group's positions.

In February of 2022, the group called on the United States Congress to reject the Abraham Accords, calling the measure "an endorsement of arms sales". The group also called on President Joe Biden to reject escalation of US involvement in the Russo-Ukrainian War following the deployment of more than 3,000 troops to eastern European countries bordering Ukraine.

Healthcare

PDA supports establishing an expanded, improved Medicare for All national healthcare program. The group also supports advocates for the right for states to establish their own health care programs with publicly financed single payer systems.

Economic and social policies

PDA supports fair trade, which it asserts would protect consumers' and workers' rights as well as the environment while opposing free trade agreements that it believes tend to let multinational corporations exploit labor worldwide. PDA is opposing renewal of fast track authority that allows the White House to enact trade deals without Congressional amendment or full oversight. This especially as regards the Trans-Pacific Partnership, a sweeping agreement which PDA believes would "save substantial negative impact on millions of people in the 12 nations holding talks, including the United States."

PDA supports the Employee Free Choice Act, which would make it easier for workers to organize unions.

Electoral reform
PDA has endorsed and advocated for legislation to protect voter rights, expand same day voter registration, end prison-based gerrymandering, and establish voting as a Constitutional Right.

Environment

PDA supports the following legislation: S. 1135 the FRAC Act aka Fracturing Responsibility and Awareness of Chemicals Act "To amend the Safe Drinking Water Act to repeal a certain exemption for hydraulic fracturing, and for other purposes", H.R. 1175 the FRESHER Act aka Focused Reduction of Effluence and Stormwater runoff through Hydrofracking Environmental Regulation Act "To amend the Federal Water Pollution Control Act and direct the Secretary of the Interior to conduct a study with respect to stormwater runoff from oil and gas operations", H.R. 1154 the BREATHE Act aka Bringing Reductions to Energy's Airborne Toxic Health Effects Act "To amend the Clean Air Act to eliminate the exemption for aggregation of emissions from oil and gas sources", and H.R. 2825 the CLEANER Act aka Closing Loopholes and Ending Arbitrary and Needless Evasion of Regulations Act "To require regulation of wastes associated with the exploration, development, or production of crude oil, natural gas, or geothermal energy under the Solid Waste Disposal Act."

PDA supports the reduction of America's dependence on fossil fuels by increasing automobile fuel economy and imposing taxation on carbon dioxide while investing in public transportation, energy conservation technologies, and alternative energy development.

Democracy Restoration Act

PDA supports legislation including constitutional amendments to protect voting rights, and opposes court decisions, legislation and other efforts to roll back the Voting Rights Act.

Criminal justice

The End Mass Criminalization Issue Team works on the following related issues, including: Mass Incarceration, Prison Industrial Complex/Privatization of Prisons, School to Prison Pipeline, Restoration of Voting Rights, Voter Suppression by Incarceration, Stop and Frisk, Harm Reduction, Criminalization of Poverty, Mandatory Minimum Sentences, Criminal Justice System, War on Drugs, Solitary Confinement.

Advisory board

Medea Benjamin
John C. Bonifaz (emeritus)
Jeff Cohen (emeritus)
Marjorie Cohn
Rep. John Conyers Jr.
Rep. Donna Edwards (emeritus)
Keith Ellison (emeritus)
Jodie Evans
Lila Garrett
Rep. Raul Grijalva
Thom Hartmann
Tom Hayden
Jim Hightower
Mimi Kennedy, Advisory Board Chair
Rep. Barbara Lee
Rep. Jim McGovern
Joel Segal (emeritus)
Andy Shallal
David Swanson  (emeritus)
Rep. Maxine Waters (emeritus)
Rep. Diane Watson (emeritus)
Rep. Lynn Woolsey  (emeritus)
Rev. Lennox Yearwood Jr. (emeritus)

References

External links

PDA YouTube channel
Conservative site database entries for PDA: 
on Discover the Networks project of the David Horowitz Freedom Center
on Influence Watch by the Capital Research Center

Democratic Party (United States) organizations
United States political action committees
Factions in the Democratic Party (United States)
Healthcare reform advocacy groups in the United States
Progressive organizations in the United States